Pyre Peak, also called Seguam Volcano, is an active stratovolcano on Seguam Island in the Aleutian Islands of Alaska.

Sources
 
 Volcanoes of the Alaska Peninsula and Aleutian Islands-Selected Photographs
 Alaska Volcano Observatory

References

External links
 Weather: Pyre Peak

Stratovolcanoes of the United States
Active volcanoes
Mountains of Alaska
Volcanoes of Alaska
Landforms of Aleutians West Census Area, Alaska
Aleutian Range
Calderas of Alaska
Mountains of Unorganized Borough, Alaska
Volcanoes of Unorganized Borough, Alaska